Barbara Parker Rowley is an American politician and Republican member of the Arizona House of Representatives elected to represent District 10 in 2022.

Elections
2022 Parker and Justin Heap were unchallenged in the Republican Primary, and they went on to defeat Democratic nominee Helen Hunter in the general election.

References

External links
 Biography at Ballotpedia

Republican Party members of the Arizona House of Representatives
Living people
Year of birth missing (living people)
21st-century American politicians